Memento is a United States National Digital Information Infrastructure and Preservation Program (NDIIPP)–funded project aimed at making Web-archived content more readily discoverable and accessible to the public.

Technical description

Memento is defined in RFC 7089 as an implementation of the time dimension of content negotiation, as defined by Tim Berners Lee in 1996.  HTTP accomplishes negotiation of content via headers. The table below shows the different headers available for HTTP that allow clients and servers to find the content that the user desires.

To understand Memento fully, one must realize that the  header provided by HTTP does not necessarily reflect when a particular version of a web page came into existence. Also, the  header may not exist in some cases.  To provide more information, the  header has been introduced to indicate when a specific representation of a web page was observed on the web.

Usage

One can find copies of page by simply navigating, in a web browser, to a link formatted, replacing urltoarchive with the full URL of the page desired:

JSON description of a Memento:
 http://timetravel.mementoweb.org/api/json/YYYY/urltoarchive
 http://timetravel.mementoweb.org/api/json/YYYYMM/urltoarchive
 http://timetravel.mementoweb.org/api/json/YYYYMMDD/urltoarchive
 http://timetravel.mementoweb.org/api/json/YYYYMMDDHH/urltoarchive
 http://timetravel.mementoweb.org/api/json/YYYYMMDDHHMM/urltoarchive
or
redirect to a Memento with a datetime that is close to a desired datetime:
 http://timetravel.mementoweb.org/memento/YYYY/urltoarchive
 http://timetravel.mementoweb.org/memento/YYYYMM/urltoarchive
 http://timetravel.mementoweb.org/memento/YYYYMMDD/urltoarchive
 http://timetravel.mementoweb.org/memento/YYYYMMDDHH/urltoarchive
 http://timetravel.mementoweb.org/memento/YYYYMMDDHHMM/urltoarchive

References

External links
 Memento Project
 The When of the Web - Extensive information about the proposal and experiment is available in the November 2009 paper
 Memento: Time Travel for the Web
 http://lanlsource.lanl.gov/hello
 http://www.cdlib.org/cdlinfo/2010/02/04/web-archive-discovery-memento-implementation-meeting/

Web archiving
Web archiving initiatives
Los Alamos National Laboratory
Old Dominion University